The Mid-American Conference Men's Basketball Player of the Year is a basketball award given to the most outstanding men's basketball player in the Mid-American Conference (MAC). The award was first given following the 1967–68 season. Four players have won the award multiple times: Tom Kozelko, Ron Harper, Gary Trent and Bonzi Wells. Trent is the only player to have been honored as player of the year three times (1993–95). There have been no ties, nor has any player from the MAC ever won any of the national player of the year awards.

Through 2023, Ohio has the most all-time winners with 11. Toledo is second with eight winners. All current members of the MAC have had at least one winner.

Key

Winners

Winners by school

Footnotes
Northern Illinois University was a member from 1973 to 1986, then left for a period. They rejoined in 1997 and continue as a member today.
Marshall University was a member starting in 1954 before being expelled from the conference in 1969 due to NCAA violations. The Thundering Herd rejoined in 1997, but left in 2005 for Conference USA.

References
General

Specific

Player of the Year
NCAA Division I men's basketball conference players of the year
Awards established in 1968
1968 establishments in the United States